Gabriel Rojo de la Vega Piccolo or simply Gabriel (born 15 October 1989), is a Mexican retired footballer who played as a defender. He played in the Primera División de México for San Luis and in the Scottish Premiership for Partick Thistle.

Club career
Born in Mexico City, Gabriel began his career with his hometown club América. He then moved to Atlante, joining their second-division team Atlante UTN (now Toros Neza).

Gabriel played two matches before being loaned to San Luis, making his professional debut on 16 March 2011, in a Copa Libertadores 1–1 away draw against Once Caldas. He made his league debut on 2 April, in a 2–3 loss against Querétaro.

On 21 January 2012, Gabriel moved to Spain, signing a contract with CD Dénia, in Segunda División B. On 1 August, he joined La Liga side Rayo Vallecano, being assigned to the reserves also in the third division.

Partick Thistle
On 27 July 2013, Gabriel signed a two-year deal with Scottish Premiership side Partick Thistle after impressing on a trial. He made his competitive debut for the club on 6 August 2013, during a 2–1 victory over Ayr United in the Scottish League Cup.

Despite appearing regularly for the side during the campaign, Gabriel had his contract terminated by mutual consent on 21 August 2014.

References

External links
 

1989 births
Living people
Footballers from Mexico City
Mexican people of Italian descent
Association football defenders
Club América footballers
Atlante F.C. footballers
San Luis F.C. players
Segunda División B players
Rayo Vallecano B players
Scottish Professional Football League players
Partick Thistle F.C. players
Mexican expatriate footballers
Mexican footballers
Mexican expatriate sportspeople in Scotland
Expatriate footballers in Spain
Expatriate footballers in Scotland